The Cabinet Seehofer I was the state government of the German state of Bavaria from 30 October 2008 to 10 October 2013. The Cabinet was headed by Minister President Horst Seehofer and was formed by a coalition of the Christian Social Union and the Free Democratic Party. It was replaced by the Cabinet Seehofer II.
Cabinet members hold the office of Ministers of their respective portfolio, except denoted otherwise.

Composition 

|}

References

Seehofer I
2008 establishments in Germany
2013 disestablishments in Germany